The 2019 Spanish Grand Prix (formally known as the Formula 1 Emirates Gran Premio de España 2019) was a Formula One motor race that took place on 12 May 2019 at the Circuit de Barcelona-Catalunya in Montmeló, Spain.

Background

Entrants

The drivers and teams were the same as the season entry list with no additional stand-in drivers for either the race or practice.

Penalties
Daniel Ricciardo carried forward a three-place grid penalty from the previous race for causing a collision with Daniil Kvyat.

Qualifying 
Valtteri Bottas set the fastest time in all three parts of qualifying to take his third consecutive pole of the season.

Qualifying classification 

Notes
  – Daniel Ricciardo received a three-place grid penalty for causing a collision at the previous round.
  – Nico Hülkenberg was required to start from the pit lane after changing the specification of his front wing during qualifying and changing brake map parameters. He also was required to start from the rear of the starting grid for changing multiple power unit components.
  – Antonio Giovinazzi received a five-place grid penalty for an unscheduled gearbox change.
  – George Russell received a five-place grid penalty for an unscheduled gearbox change.

Race
Valtteri Bottas started the race from pole position, but his teammate Lewis Hamilton made a slightly better start from second on the grid to take the lead into the first corner. Sebastian Vettel briefly pulled his Ferrari into second around the outside of Turn 1 as Bottas, stuck between Vettel and Hamilton, was forced to yield. However, Vettel promptly ran wide in Turn 1 and allowed Bottas back into second place. Red Bull's Max Verstappen took advantage of the Ferraris' squabbling through the first two turns to move into third place with an overtake around the outside of Vettel in Turn 3, and comfortably held on to the last podium position for the remainder of the race.

While Vettel was ordered by the Ferrari pitwall to allow teammate Charles Leclerc into fourth place in the early running, the two would later switch positions back and Vettel would eventually lead home a Ferrari 4-5 finish. On lap 44, the safety car was brought out by the only retirements of the day, as Racing Point's Lance Stroll and McLaren's Lando Norris collided in Turn 2. The safety car bunched up the field with 22 laps remaining but ultimately did not change the running order among the top 6 drivers, with the most notable result of the safety car being the subsequent battle between the two Haas drivers that saw Kevin Magnussen overtake teammate Romain Grosjean, who subsequently slipped back to 10th place by the end of the race.

Haas would ultimately be the only team outside of the top 3 to score a double points finish, and were joined by 8th placed Carlos Sainz Jr. and 9th placed Daniil Kvyat in the bottom half of the points. Hamilton led his teammate home by just over four seconds, taking his third straight victory in Spain. He also claimed the fastest lap of the race on Lap 54, only missing out on a grand slam by virtue of not starting from pole position. The podium of the race was exactly the same as the previous year. Both Ferrari drivers Sebastian Vettel and Charles Leclerc finished in fourth and fifth place respectively.

Dieter Zetche Mercedes's team managing director for which the competition was the last in the joined the podium to receive the winning manufacturer's award.

Race classification

Notes
  – Includes one point for the fastest lap.

Championship standings after the race 

Drivers' Championship standings

Constructors' Championship standings

 Note: Only the top five positions are included for both sets of standings.

See also
 2019 Barcelona Formula 2 round
 2019 Barcelona Formula 3 round

References

Spanish Grand Prix
Grand Prix
Spain Grand Prix
Spain